The 1997 AT&T Canada Canadian Mixed Curling Championship was held January 11-19 at the Kindersley Curling Club in Kindersley, Saskatchewan.

Team Northern Ontario won the event, defeating British Columbia in the final. To get to the final, Northern Ontario had to beat Prince Edward Island in a tiebreaker, and then win two playoff matches against Nova Scotia and Alberta. In the final, the team had to come back from being down 5–2 after give ends. They scored two in the sixth, and stole one in the seventh and eighth ends to take the lead. They then forced B.C. to take one in the ninth, giving them the hammer (last rock advantage) into the final end. To win the game, Northern Ontario skip Chris Johnson had to make a perfect double takeout for the win, which he made. It was the third national title for Northern Ontario, which had previously won in 1979 and 1981. 

The event set a record attendance at the time for the Canadian Mixed, with 19,910 spectators.

The final was televised on TSN.

Teams
Teams were as follows:

Standings
Final standings

Tiebreakers
 8-4

Playoffs

Final
January 19, 6:30pm

References

Canadian Mixed Curling Championship
Curling in Saskatchewan
1997 in Canadian curling
1997 in Saskatchewan
Kindersley
January 1997 sports events in Canada